RWSfm 103.3 is the community radio station for Bury St Edmunds, Suffolk and the surrounding areas offering music and local information. The station was awarded a community radio licence by Ofcom in 2010 and began broadcasting on 13 August 2010. Community Radio stations in the UK are required to provide a social gain to the community they serve. RWSfm 103.3 is one of a growing number of such community stations in the UK and currently broadcasts around 70 hours of live programming each week, including Bury's Big Breakfast with Julie MacLeod from 7am, Bury's Big Drive Home With Ryan McClean from 4pm. During the day the station plays a mixture of popular music with local news, sport, interviews, information, traffic and travel and weather. During the evenings and at weekends there is a selection of specialist music shows including a rock, world music and country.

History 

Launched in August 2010, RWSfm 103.3 started broadcasting to Bury St Edmunds and surrounding villages on 103.3fm from its studios just off Hardwick Lane, having previously broadcast in various other methods for decades.

From the summer of 2015, RWSfm 103.3 launched its own local news bulletin broadcasting local news stories at half past each hour 7 days a week, 7:30am – 6:30pm. This followed a warning from the broadcast regulator Ofcom who found the station in breach of failing to adhere to its key commitments and was put on notice subsequently.

In December 2019 the station was awarded, by Ofcom, extra power to broadcast further in to the community in West Suffolk. In August 2020 the regulator then granted the station a second five year extension to its licence.

References

External links
RWSfm 103.3 Website
Key Station Commitments from Ofcom
Coverage Map from Ofcom

Community radio stations in the United Kingdom
Radio stations established in 2010
Radio stations in Suffolk